This is the complete list of men's Olympic medalists in swimming.

womens's events

50 metre freestyle

100 metre freestyle

200 metre freestyle

400 metre freestyle

800 metre freestyle

1500 metre freestyle

100 metre backstroke

200 metre backstroke

100 metre breaststroke

200 metre breaststroke

100 metre butterfly

200 metre butterfly

200 metre individual medley

400 metre individual medley

4 × 100 metre freestyle relay

Note: since 1992, swimmers who swam only in preliminary rounds also received medals.

4 × 200 metre freestyle relay

Note: since 1992, swimmers who swam only in preliminary rounds also received medals.

4 × 100 metre medley relay

Note: Since 1992, relay swimmers who swam in the preliminary rounds, but not the event final, have also received medals when their team finished among the top three in the final.

10 km marathon

Mixed Events

4 × 100 metre medley relay

Discontinued events

50 yard freestyle

100 metre for sailors

100 yard freestyle

220 yard freestyle

440 yard freestyle

500 metre freestyle

880 yard freestyle

1000 metre freestyle

1200 metre freestyle

1 mile freestyle

4000 metre freestyle

100 yard backstroke

400 metre breaststroke

440 yard breaststroke

200 metre team race

4 × 50 yard freestyle relay

200 metre obstacle race

Underwater swimming

All-time medal table – Swimming – Men – 1896–2016

See also
 List of Olympic medalists in swimming (women)
 List of individual gold medalists in swimming at the Olympics and World Aquatics Championships (men)
 List of gold medalist relay teams in swimming at the Olympics and World Aquatics Championships
 List of top Olympic gold medalists in swimming
 Swimming at the Summer Olympics
 List of World Aquatics Championships medalists in swimming (men)
 List of Asian Games medalists in swimming

References

 International Olympic Committee results database
 Wallechinsky, David (2000). The complete book of the Summer Olympics – Sydney 2000 edition. New York: Overlook Press. .
HistoFINA Swimming Medallists And Statistics At Olympic Games, January 31, 2015

Swimming (men)
Swimming
medalists
Olympics (men)